Perseis was a city of ancient Macedon founded by Philip V of Macedon around 168 BCE and named for his son, Perseus.  The city's exact location has not be confirmed, but Livy tells us that it was near Stobi. The editors of the Barrington Atlas of the Greek and Roman World suggest a site near Črnobuki in North Macedonia.

References

Geography of ancient Paeonia
Antigonid colonies in Macedonia
Lost ancient cities and towns
Former populated places in the Balkans
Populated places in ancient Macedonia